Nic Collins is a woodfire potter that works in Devon, on the edge of Dartmoor.

Early life
Nic Collins was born in 1958 in Leamington Spa, Warwickshire. He is a self-taught woodfire potter who started to build kilns and wheels during all of his 20s. He also experimented with raku, salt glazing and sawdust firings, and using clay sourced from local river banks during this same time. Collins has some formal schooling in ceramics from Derby College of Art from 1985-86 before going off to Italy and Germany in other studios before returning to Devon. He now works in his anagama kiln firing pots in Devon by Dartmoor.

Process
He uses stoneware clay thrown on a kick wheel. He does not worry about if a pot is perfect. He finds his aesthetics through imperfections. For example, he talks about how he had a crush on a girl because she had a large scar on her face. Collins way of throwing is added to through the way he decorates his pots. Through the woodfire process he creates imperfections by placing pots on their side on top of shells. Collins mentioned that through the process of putting pots on their sides and stacking them on their sides the interesting area of the pots will not be on the bottom but on the front. Through woodfire in anagama kilns decoration can be made by stacking pots on top of each other and Collins does so.

Inspiration and philosophy
He has found that simple pots are beautiful and finds that the ancient medieval pots are some of the most beautiful pots, in Collins opinion. he mentions very often that he believes that pots should be made from the heart and not from the head. He also found that if you only think in how thin, how stretched, how light a pot is then the pot is not a bad pot it just makes the pot stiff and people don't want to pick it up.

References

External links
 http://www.nic-collins.co.uk/infopage.htm
 http://www.studiopottery.com/cgi-bin/mp.cgi?item=294

English artists
1958 births
Living people